Darryl Cox may refer to:

 Darryl Cox (actor) (born 1955), American film and television actor
 Darryl Cox (footballer) (born 1961), former Australian rules footballer